Civilization is a franchise composed primarily of a series of turn-based strategy video games and associated media. The core of the franchise is a series of six titles for personal computers, released between 1991 and 2016. Sid Meier developed the first game in the series and has had creative input for most of its sequels. The official titles of the series, core games, and most spin-offs include his name, as in Sid Meier's Civilization. In addition to the main titles, the franchise includes multiple expansion packs and spin-off games, as well as board games inspired by the video game series. The series is considered a formulative example of the 4X genre, in which players achieve victory through four routes: "eXplore, eXpand, eXploit, and eXterminate".

The first game in the series, Civilization (1991), was created by MicroProse co-founder Meier and Bruce Shelley. MicroProse continued the series for several years, producing Civilization II (1996) as well as a spin-off title, Sid Meier's Colonization (1994). Business changes after the consolidation of the company in 1996 with Spectrum HoloByte, which bought MicroProse in 1993, resulted in Meier leaving the company to found Firaxis Games in 1996. Firaxis created a spin-off title, Sid Meier's Alpha Centauri (1999), but did not have the rights to the "Civilization" name. MicroProse did not produce any further games in the series beyond licensing the name to Activision for the spin-off Civilization: Call to Power (1999) before being purchased by Hasbro in 1998. Hasbro, along with the "Civilization" brand, was in turn purchased by Infogrames in 2001, who licensed the name to Firaxis for Civilization III (2001). The rights to the franchise were sold in 2004, however, to Take-Two Interactive, which licensed it to Firaxis again for Civilization IV (2005) just before acquiring Firaxis itself in 2005. Firaxis has since served as the primary developer and Take-Two the sole publisher for the franchise, producing main-series games Civilization V (2010) and Civilization VI (2016) along with seven spin-off titles, including console and mobile versions of the franchise in Civilization Revolution (2008) and titles such as Civilization: Beyond Earth (2014).

In addition to video games, the franchise includes several board games, artbooks, and music albums. The first board game, Civilization: The Boardgame (2002), corresponds with Civilization III, while the second game by that name (2010) is based on Civilization IV, and the latest, Civilization: A New Dawn (2017), is based on Civilization VI. A card game, created by  Civilization IV lead designer Soren Johnson and based on that game, was included with the Civilization Chronicles (2006) compilation. Books containing concept art and commentary for Civilization V and VI have been included in special editions of the game. Music CDs were included with the special editions of Civilization IV and V; digital albums have been sold for Civilization VI and its expansion, as well as for Civilization: Beyond Earth and its expansion. The Grammy Award for Best Arrangement, Instrumental and Vocals-winning theme song for IV, "Baba Yetu", was included in composer Christopher Tin's album Calling All Dawns, while the theme song for VI, "Sogno di Volare", has been released as a single by Tin.

Video games

Main series

Other games

Tabletop games

Books

Music

References

External links
 Official website

Media
Media lists by video games franchise
Mass media by franchise